Gondola District is a district of Manica Province in western Mozambique. The principal town is Gondola. It has a population of 262,412 as of 2007.

Geography
The district is located in the east of the province, and borders with Gorongosa District of Sofala Province to the northeast, Nhamatanda District of Sofala Province to the east, Buzi District of Sofala Province to the southeast, Macate District to the south and southwest, Chimoio District to the west, and Vanduzi District to the northwest.

The main river in the district is the Pungwe River, which makes the border with Gorongosa District.

The climate of the district varies with altitude.

History
The settlement of Gondola was developed as a station on a railroad connecting Beira and Salisbury.

Demographics
As of 2005, 46% of the population of the district was younger than 15 years. 44% did speak Portuguese. The most common mothertongue is Chitwe language. 63% were analphabetic, mostly women.

Administrative divisions
The district is divided into four postos, Amatongas (three localities), Cafumbe (three localities), Gondola (one locality), and Inchope (three localities).

Economy
2% of the households in the district have access to electricity.

Agriculture
In the district, there are 39,000 farms which have on average  of land. The main agricultural products are corn, cassava, cowpea, peanut, sorghum, sweet potato, and rice.

Transportation
In particular, the national road EN1 (paved) crosses the district north to south, and the national road EN6 (unpaved) connects the coast with Zimbabwe. In 2005,  of roads were closed because of minefields.

A railroad connecting Beira with Machipanda and Zimbabwe crosses the district.

References

Districts in Manica Province